Fingers in the Wind is a 2022 drama film directed by Chad Murdock. The film explores the mind of a young woman inhibited by an unclear memory from her childhood. Fingers in the Wind had its international premiere at the 2022 New Orleans Film Festival.

Plot
A nameless young man (Azendé Kendale Johnson), purchases flowers and shows up at the apartment building of his love interest, Naya (Maya Holliday), but when he rings the bell she is too busy breaking up with her best friend, Faye Wood (Taylor Brianna), to answer.
The young man gives up and leaves with the flowers, while the conversation with Naya causes Faye to flee the apartment as well. The two of them wind up in the same place at the park, meeting each other for the first time, when Faye mistakes the young man for a complicated figure from her childhood. They spend a romantic afternoon together, but it soon unravels after a strange encounter with Naya, forcing Faye to face the true nature of her relationship with Naya, as well as the person she mistakes the young man for. 
The next morning, Faye flies to her hometown, but soon realizes she is the stranger in town, unrecognizable to everyone, including Nelly, the boy, and her mother.

Cast
 Taylor Brianna – Faye Wood
 Azendé Kendale Johnson – Young Man
 Maya Holliday – Naya
 Torri Grice – Ms. Barnes

Release 
The film premiered at the 2022 New Orleans Film Festival.

Critical reception 
Fingers in the Wind received positive critical reception. It holds a 100% "Fresh" rating on Rotten Tomatoes based on five reviews. Reviewing for Film Threat, Jason Delgado stated that "the cast and Chad Murdoch’s originality in both techniques and narrative made it a worthwhile journey." In a review for The Independent Critic, Richard Propes wrote, "Fingers in the Wind will prove to be a unique and rewarding experience."

References

External links
 
 
 

2022 films
African-American films
American drama films
Films set in New York City
Films shot in New York City 
2020s English-language films
2020s American films